Przemysław Skwirczyński (born November 3, 1952, in Lublin in Poland) is a Polish cinematographer.

He graduated from the National Film School in Łódź in 1978 and gained the diploma in 1981.

He is the son of Jerzy Skwirczyński and Wanda Skwirczyński (née Waryszak) and is married to Krystyna Ptak, the sister of another Polish cinematographer, Krzysztof Ptak. They have one son, Przemysław.

Filmography 
Source: FilmPolski
 Książę (1981)
 Hamadria (1981)
 ... jestem przeciw (1985)
 Maskarada (1986)
 Rykowisko (1986)
 Stan strachu (1989)
 Niech żyje miłość (1991)
 Warszawa. Année 5703 (Eng: Warsaw - Year 5703) (1992)
 Tragarz puchu (1992)
 Wyliczanka (1994)
 Deborah (1995)
 Deszczowy żołnierz (1996)
 Pułapka (Eng: A Trap) (1997)
 Pokój na czarno (2001)
 Marzenia do spełnienia (2002)

References

External links 
 
Przemysław Skwirczyński on MSN Movies
Przemysław Skwirczyński on Yahoo! Movies
Przemysław Skwirczyński on VH1
Przemysław Skwirczyński on MTV

1952 births
Living people
Polish cinematographers
Film people from Łódź